Marek Trončinský (13 September 1988 – 22 May 2021) was a Czech professional ice hockey defenceman who played his last games with CS Progym Gheorgheni in the Erste Liga. Before that he was with UK EIHL side Sheffield Steelers. Trončinský also previously represented HC Bílí Tygři Liberec in the Czech Extraliga.

Trončinský previously played for HC Kladno (2005–2010), SK Horácká Slavia Třebíč, HC Slovan Ústečtí Lvi, Khanty-Mansiysk Yugra, HC Slovan Bratislava, Trinec Ocelari HC, Mlada Boleslav BK, Pardubice HC, Litvinov HC,

References

External links
 

1988 births
2021 deaths
Czech expatriate ice hockey people
Czech expatriate ice hockey players in Slovakia
Czech expatriate ice hockey players in Russia
Czech expatriate sportspeople in England
Czech expatriate sportspeople in Romania
Czech ice hockey defencemen
HC Bílí Tygři Liberec players
HC Dynamo Pardubice players
HC Slovan Bratislava players
HC Yugra players
Rytíři Kladno players
Sheffield Steelers players
Sportspeople from Ústí nad Labem